Football Cup of the Russian SFSR was a playoff republican competitions in association football that were taken place in Russian SFSR in 1973–1991.

Finals

External links
 Football Cup of the Russian SFSR at footballfacts.ru

References

Russian SFSR
Russia
Recurring sporting events established in 1973
1973 establishments in Russia
Defunct football competitions in Russia
1991 disestablishments in Russia
Recurring events disestablished in 1991